is a Japan-exclusive video game for the Super Famicom that uses the actual ball players and teams of the 1995 Nippon Professional Baseball league and combines them into a full-blown simulator.

Gameplay

Pitchers throw the ball to the batter using a television-like angle. The strike-ball-out counter is used like in a real Japanese baseball match. While the game takes place in fictitious Hect Stadium, the action is very close to watching an actual professional baseball match. There is a lot of information for batters and pitchers to digest like pitching tendencies, earned run averages, batting averages, and even the current wind levels. Everything is in Japanese including the menu options and the player's surnames.

Players can choose to pitch either inside or outside the strike zone by moving the ball across a series of two boxes. The red box is the batter's immediate zone of batting while the yellow box is the entire width of home plate. Each button on the Super Famicom controller represents a base to throw in case one of the runners decide to steal a base. Unlike North America where the keys were assigned letters, the four major buttons on the Japanese game controller were assigned colors (as it was easier for Japanese users to memorize colors instead of the Latin letters A, B, X, and Y).

This game is a prequel to Furuta Atsuya no Simulation Pro Yakyuu 2; which would enhance on various features in this game.

Reception
On release, Famicom Tsūshin scored the game a 21 out of 40.

References

1995 video games
Hect games
Japan-exclusive video games
Nippon Professional Baseball video games
Super Nintendo Entertainment System games
Super Nintendo Entertainment System-only games
Video games set in 1995
Multiplayer and single-player video games
Video games developed in Japan